BIAS (originally known as Berkley Integrated Audio Software) was a privately held corporation based in Petaluma, California. It ceased all business operations as of June, 2012.

History 
Composer/software engineer Steve Berkley initially created Peak for editing the samples used in his musical compositions.  Peak started out as a utility for transferring content ("samples") from a hardware sampler to a Macintosh computer, editing the samples, and returning them to the sampler for playback/performance. The utility evolved into a commercial sample editing application, “Peak”. BIAS Inc. was founded in 1994 in Sausalito, California, by Steve and Christine Berkley.

Products 
Peak is a stereo sample editor – and was BIAS’ flagship product. SoundSoap is a noise reduction/audio restoration plug-in and stand-alone application.  SoundSoap is designed to remove unwanted clicks, crackles, pops, hum, rumble, and broadband noise (such as tape hiss and HVAC system noise). SoundSoap Pro is a noise reduction/audio restoration plug-in. It is based on the same technology as SoundSoap, but offers a more advanced user interface, with the ability to access and fine-tune many parameters not available in the standard version.  In addition to removing clicks, crackles, pops, hum, rumble, and broadband noise (such as tape hiss and HVAC system noise), SoundSoap Pro also features an integrated noise gate. The Master Perfection suite has six processing plug-ins with features for mastering, sound design, and general audio processing.

Deck is a simple multitrack DAW (digital audio workstation) designed for working with digital audio.  While Deck offers limited MIDI features – such as MIDI control of the integrated transport and mixing console, and the ability to import and play back a MIDI file in sync with digital audio – it is not a MIDI sequencing application.  Deck specializes in recording analog audio sources, such as musical instruments and microphones – as well as in multimedia and post-production, where its QuickTime foundation allows it to synchronize with digital video and QuickTime movies for mono, stereo, and 5.1 surround sound mixing.  Two editions were offered: “Deck” – a professional DAW, and “Deck LE” – a limited feature, entry level DAW – both run on Mac OS 8.6, Mac OS 9, and Mac OS X computer systems.

Product timeline 

1/96 – Peak 1.0 debuts at NAMM Show in Anaheim, CA.
11/96 – BIAS Introduces Peak LE – entry level stereo editor
1/97 – SFX Machine 1.0 multi-effects plug-in introduced
9/98 – BIAS acquires Deck DAW from Macromedia
12/98 – Peak 2.0 introduced – adds DAE, TDM, AudioSuite, QuickTime movie, Premiere plug-in support, and CD burning
8/99 – BIAS Brings Peak to BeOS
1/00 – Peak 2.1 adds ASIO driver support – expands compatibility with third-party audio hardware
9/00 – Peak 2.5 introduced – adds VST plug-in support
1/01 – Deck 2.7 adds ASIO driver support – expands compatibility with third-party audio hardware
1/01 – BIAS introduces Deck LE – entry level DAW
7/01 – BIAS introduces Deck 3.0 – adds real-time VST plug-in support 
8/01 – Vbox 1.0 effect plug-in routing matrix introduced
11/01 – Peak DV 3.0 introduced – first pro audio application for Mac OS X
1/02 – Peak and Peak LE 3.0 introduced – run on Mac OS 8.6, 9.x, X
1/02 – BIAS introduces SuperFreq paragraphic equalizer plug-in for Mac OS 8.6, 9.x, X
6/02 – BIAS introduces Deck 3.5 – the first professional DAW to run on Mac OS X adds 5.1 surround mixing 
7/02 – Entire BIAS product line now runs on Mac OS X
8/02 – BIAS introduces Vbox 1.1 – runs on Mac OS X and Windows operating systems
12/02 – BIAS introduces SoundSoap – runs on Mac OS X and Windows XP operating systems
8/03 – Peak 4.0 introduced – adds direct CD burning, Audio Unit support, sample-based ImpulseVerb, and Sqweez compressor plug-in
5/04 – SoundSoap Pro introduced – runs on Mac OS X and Windows XP
10/04 – SoundSoap 2 introduced – adds Click & Crackle removal, audio enhancement, and Audio Unit/RTAS/DirectX formats, drag and drop file support
8/05 – BIAS introduces Peak Pro 5 – adds industry-leading sample rate conversion and graphical waveform view to playlist, DDP export capability
9/05 – BIAS introduces Peak Pro XT & Peak LE 5 – XT power bundle includes Peak Pro 5, SoundSoap 2, SoundSoap Pro, and Master Perfection Suite plug-ins
6/06 – Peak 5.2 introduced – Universal version runs natively on PPC and Intel-based Macintosh computers
11/06 – SoundSoap 2.1 introduced – Universal version runs natively on PPC and Intel-based Macintosh computers

June 2012 – BIAS Inc. announces that it ceases all operations.

References

External links 
 BIAS website

Software companies based in California
Macintosh software companies
Companies based in Sonoma County, California
Defunct software companies of the United States